Felix Lutz Michel (born 4 October 1984 in Freital) is a German slalom canoeist who competed at the international level from 2000 to 2009 in the C2 class together with Sebastian Piersig.

He won a silver medal in the C2 team event at the 2006 ICF Canoe Slalom World Championships in Prague. He also won two gold medals in the same event at the European Championships.

Michel finished sixth in the C2 event at the 2008 Summer Olympics in Beijing.

World Cup individual podiums

References

1984 births
Canoeists at the 2008 Summer Olympics
German male canoeists
Living people
Olympic canoeists of Germany
Medalists at the ICF Canoe Slalom World Championships
People from Freital
Sportspeople from Saxony